General Hogan may reder to:

Daniel Hogan (general) (born 1895), Irish Army general
Louis Hogan (1921–2001), Irish Defence Forces lieutenant general

See also
Attorney General Hogan (disambiguation)